Peter Byaruhanga (born 18 August 1979) is a Ugandan former professional soccer player, active primarily in the United States, who played as a striker.

Personal life
Byaruhanga was born in Kampala, Uganda and holds dual American-Ugandan citizenship.

Career

College career
Byaruhanga played for the UAB Blazers in the 1998 and 1999 seasons.

Professional career
In February 2000, the Kansas City Wizards selected Byaruhanga in the second round of the 2000 MLS SuperDraft.  He made six appearances for the Wizards over two seasons.  In May 2000, the Wizards sent Byaruhanga on loan to the Raleigh Express for five games.  In 2001, he went on loan to the Atlanta Silverbacks.  On June 18, 2001, the Wizards waived Byaruhanga.  On July 6, 2001, he signed with the Richmond Kickers.  In 2002, he played for both the Cincinnati Riverhawks and the Carolina Dynamo of the USL D3-Pro League. In 2009, he played for Rocket City United.

References

External links
 

1979 births
Living people
American people of Ugandan descent
Atlanta Silverbacks players
Sporting Kansas City players
North Carolina Fusion U23 players
Major League Soccer players
Raleigh (Capital) Express players
Richmond Kickers players
UAB Blazers men's soccer players
Ugandan footballers
Ugandan expatriate footballers
USL Second Division players
A-League (1995–2004) players
Sporting Kansas City draft picks
Cincinnati Riverhawks players
Association football forwards
Ugandan expatriate sportspeople in the United States
Rocket City United players
National Premier Soccer League players
Expatriate soccer players in the United States
Sportspeople from Kampala